S.M. Mozibur Rahman (born 12 June 1955) is a Bangladeshi justice of the High Court Division. He was appointed in 2015.

Early life 
Rahman was born on 12 July 1966. He completed a bachelors of arts and another bachelors of law.

Career 
Rahman joined as a district Munsif on 22 February 1984.

On 9 May 2007, Rahman was promoted to District Judge.

On 12 February 2015, Rahman was made an additional judge of the High Court Division of Bangladesh Supreme Court.

In January 2017, Rahman and Justice Zinat Ara granted anticipatory bail to Afsan Chowdhury, professor of BRAC University, in case filed Masud Uddin Chowdhury. over a Facebook post. Rahman became a permanent  judge of the High Court Division of Bangladesh Supreme Court on 8 February 2017.

In November 2018, Rahman and Justice A. K. M. Asaduzzaman granted bail to former Prime Minister Khaleda Zia in an arson case filed in Comilla in January 2015.

Rahman and Justice A. K. M. Asaduzzaman granted bail to the editor of Amar Desh online, Mahmudur Rahman, in a case over making derogatory remarks about Prime Minister Sheikh Hasina and Sheikh Mujibur Rahman.

Rahman and Justice A. K. M. Asaduzzaman granted bail to former Awami League member of parliament Amanur Rahman Khan Rana on 14 March 2019 in the 2013 Faruk Ahmed murder case.

On 8 March 2020, Rahman and Justice A. K. M. Asaduzzaman cancelled the bail to G.K. Shamim, a well known contractor.

In November 2021, Rahman was removed from a bench overseeing corruption cases by the chief justice after getting into an argument with fellow Justice Md Nazrul Islam Talukder. He was replaced by Justice A. K. M. Zahirul Huq.

In January 2022, Rahman and Justice Md. Habibul Gani refused to grant bail to sister of journalist Kanak Sarwar in a Digital Security Act case.

References 

Living people
1955 births
Supreme Court of Bangladesh justices